The III. Path or The Third Path is a far-right and neo-Nazi political party in Germany.

It was founded on 28 September 2013 by former NPD officials, and activists from the banned Free Network South. They have ties with Assad's government in Syria, Hezbollah in Lebanon, the National Corps, Misanthropic Division, Right Sector and Svoboda in Ukraine, the Nordic Resistance Movement in the Nordic countries. Their founder and chairman is Klaus Armstroff. The party mostly operates in Thuringia, Bavaria and Brandenburg.

A group of people bearing Der Dritte Weg flags marched in through a town in Saxony on 1 May 2019, the day before the Jewish remembrance of the Holocaust, carrying a banner saying "Social justice instead of criminal foreigners". The Central Council of Jews said that the state government should ban such marches if it were serious about tackling right-wing extremism. The party stood in the 2019 European elections.

Election results

Federal Parliament (Bundestag)

European Parliament

State elections

See also

Far-right politics in Germany
 Strasserism
 Neo-Nazism in Germany
 Neo-völkisch

References

2013 establishments in Germany
Antisemitism in Germany
Fascist parties in Germany
German nationalist political parties
Neo-Nazi political parties in Europe
Neo-Nazism in Germany
Third Position
Political parties established in 2013
Nationalist parties in Germany
Neo-fascist parties
Strasserism